Tanah Bumbu is one of the regencies in the Indonesian province of South Kalimantan. It was formerly part of Kotabaru Regency, but was split off on 25 February 2003 to form a separate regency, following dissatisfaction on the Kalimantan mainland territories with administration from Laut Island. It covers an area of 4,890.3 km2 and had a population of 267,929 at the 2010 Census and 322,646 at the 2020 Census; the latest official estimate (as at mid 2021) is 328,146. The regency's capital is the town of Batulicin.

Administrative Districts
At the 2020 Census Tanah Bumbu Regency was divided into ten districts (kecamatan), but two new districts have subsequently been added - Kusan Tengah from part of Kusan Hilir District, and Teluk Kepayang from part of Kusan Hulu District. The twelve districts are listed below with their areas and their 2010 and 2020 Census populations, together with the official estimates as at mid 2021. The table includes the locations of the district administrative centres, the number of administrative villages (totalling 144 rural desa and 5 urban kelurahan) in each district, and its post code.

Notes: (a) the figure for the new Kusan Tengah District is included with that for Kusan Hilir District, from which it was cut out. (b) the figure for the new Teluk Kepayang District is included with that for Kusan Hulu District, from which it was cut out. (c) includes the three offshore islands of Suwangi, Anak Suwangi and Sungai Dua.(d) not to be confused with the district of the same name in Banjar Regency.(e) includes the three offshore islands of Burung, Hantu and Tampakan.

References

Regencies of South Kalimantan